These are the official results of the Women's 100 metres Freestyle event at the 1993 FINA Short Course World Championships held on the first day of the competition, on 2 December 1993 in Palma de Mallorca, Spain.

Finals

Qualifying heats

See also
1992 Women's Olympic Games 100m Freestyle
1993 Women's European LC Championships 100m Freestyle

References
 Results
 swimrankings

F
1993 in women's swimming